Events from the year 1928 in Japan. It corresponds to Shōwa 3 (昭和3年) in the Japanese calendar.

Incumbents
Emperor: Hirohito
Prime Minister: Tanaka Giichi

Governors
Aichi Prefecture: Toyoji Obata
Akita Prefecture: Yuichiro Chikaraishi (until 28 February); Iwao Koinuma (starting 28 February)
Aomori Prefecture: Tetsuzo Yoshimura  
Ehime Prefecture: Yujiro Ozaki (until 25 May); Keizo Ichimura (starting 25 May)
Fukui Prefecture: Keizo Ichimura (until 25 May); Joko Obama (starting 25 May)
Fukuoka Prefecture: Saito Morikuni 
Fukushima Prefecture: Ito Kihachiro (until 25 May); Aid Kiyoo (starting 25 May)
Gifu Prefecture: Rokuichiro Ono (until 25 May); Masao Kanazawa (starting 25 May)
Gunma Prefecture: Agata Shinobu (until 10 January); Omori Keiichi (starting 10 January)
Hiroshima Prefecture: Sukenari Yokoyama (until 25 May); Masao Kishimoto (starting 25 May)
Ibaraki Prefecture: Jiro Morioka
Ishikawa Prefecture: vacant
Iwate Prefecture: 
 until 11 January: Kakichi Tokuno
 11 January-26 December: Fujihira Marumo
 starting 26 December: Tojiro Io 
Kagawa Prefecture: Toshio Motoda 
Kanagawa Prefecture: Ikeda Hiroshi 
Kochi Prefecture: Aidkame Kiyoo (until 25 May); Ichiro Oshima (starting 25 May)
Kumamoto Prefecture: Saito Munenori 
Kyoto Prefecture: Shigeyoshi Omihara 
Mie Prefecture: Endo Ryusaku (until 28 February); Iori Hanada (starting 28 February)
Miyagi Prefecture: Katorataro Ushizu 
Miyazaki Prefecture: Akira Kouda (until 10 January); Kunitoshi Yamaoka (starting 10 January)
Nagano Prefecture: Ryo Chiba 
Niigata Prefecture:
 until 28 February: Shohei Fujinoma
 28 February-28 May: Yuichiro Chikaraishi
 starting 25 May: Ozaki Yujiro 
Okayama Prefecture: Masao Kishimoto 
Okinawa Prefecture: Tōjirō Iio (until 26 December); Chōhei Hosokawa (starting 26 December)
Osaka Prefecture: Harumichi Tanabe (until month unknown); Yūichirō Chikaraishi (starting month unknown)
Saitama Prefecture: Chohei Hosokawa
Shiname Prefecture: Rinsaku Yagi 
Tochigi Prefecture: Takeichi Fujiyama
Tokyo: Hiroshi Hiratsuka
Toyama Prefecture: Shirane Takesuke 
Yamagata Prefecture: Shinohara Eitaro

Events

February 11–19 – Japan competes in the 1928 Winter Olympics in  St. Moritz, Switzerland, the first true Winter Olympics held on its own and not in conjunction with a Summer Olympics.
February 20 – 1928 Japanese general election: The first general election after the introduction of universal male suffrage was passed in 1925. The ruling Rikken Seiyūkai led by Prime Minister Tanaka Giichi won one more seat than the opposition Rikken Minseitō led by Hamaguchi Osachi, although Rikken Minseitō had received slightly more votes. The hung parliament led to the Tanaka government continuing in office.
March 15 – March 15 incident: Alarmed by gains made by socialists and communists in the 1928 general election, the conservative government of Prime Minister Giichi Tanaka ordered the mass arrest of known communists and suspected communist sympathizers. The arrests occurred throughout Japan, and a total of 1652 people were apprehended.
May 3 – Jinan Incident: an armed conflict between the Japanese Imperial Army allied with Northern Chinese warlords against the Kuomintang's southern army, occurs in Jinan, eastern China.
June 4 – Huanggutun Incident:  Chinese warlord Zhang Zuolin is killed by low-ranking officer in the Japanese Kwantung Army when a bomb his personal train is travelling over explodes. Emperor Hirohito harshly criticized the event and eventually dismissed Prime Minister Tanaka Giichi for his inability to arrest and prosecute the plotters of the incident.
July 28–August 12 – Japan competes in the ninth Summer Olympics held in Amsterdam, Netherlands. For the 1928 Olympics, Japan won 2 golds, 2 silvers and 1 bronze.
September 28 – Prince Chichibu marries Matsudaira Setsuko.
November 10 – Enthronement of Hirohito as Emperor of Japan in the Imperial Palace in Kyoto.
December 21 – Fujikoshi Steel Industry, later Nachi-Fujikoshi founded in Toyama City.
Unknown date – A food processing Ito Meat Packer was founded, as predecessor of Itoham-Yonekyu in Nishinomiya, Hyogo Prefecture.

Births
January 1 – Masatoshi Yoshino, geographer, climatologist (d. 2017)
January 2
Daisaku Ikeda, religious leader
Tamio Oki, voice actor (d. 2017)
 January 22 – Yoshihiko Amino, historian (d. 2004)
 February 20 – Mitsuyo Asaka, actress (d. 2020)
 March 9 – Tatsumi Hijikata, choreographer, (d. 1986)
 March 10 – Kiyoshi Atsumi, actor (d. 1996)
 March 16 – Wakanohana Kanji I, sumo wrestler (d. 2010)
 March 27
Ryuji Saikachi, voice actor (d. 2017)
Seiko Tanabe, author (d. 2019)
 April 18 – Mikio Sato, mathematician (d. 2023)
 May 8 – Tatsuhiko Shibusawa, novelist, art critic, and translator (d. 1987)
 June 23 – Hayao Kawai, psychologist (d. 2007)
 June 26 – Yoshiro Nakamatsu, inventor
 July 21 – Hirofumi Uzawa, economist (d. 2014)
 August 16 – Shōji Yasui, actor (d. 2014)
 September 6 – Fumihiko Maki, architect
 September 16 – Hironoshin Furuhashi, former swimmer and chairman of Japan Olympic Committee (d. 2009) 
 September 20 – Shiro Hashizume, Olympic swimmer 
 November 3 – Osamu Tezuka, manga artist, cartoonist, animator, film producer and medical doctor (d. 1989)
 November 30 – Takako Doi, politician (Speakers of the House) (d. 2014)

Deaths
 February 17 – Ōtsuki Fumihiko,  lexicographer, linguist, and historian (b. 1847)
 March 8 – Sachiko, Princess Hisa, second child of Emperor Shōwa (b. 1927)
 April 5 – Okura Kihachiro,  entrepreneur (b. 1837)
 May 4 – Jinzō Matsumura, botanist (b. 1856)
 May 21 – Hideyo Noguchi, bacteriologist (b. 1876)
July 23 – Zenzō Kasai, novelist (b. 1887)
 October 25 – Hirotsu Ryurō, novelist (b. 1861)
 November 3  – Uryū Shigeko, educator (b. 1862)
 December 25 – Kaoru Osanai, theater director, playwright, and actor (b. 1881)

See also
List of Japanese films of the 1920s

References

 
1920s in Japan
Years of the 20th century in Japan